Highland County Airport  is a public-owned, public-use airport located at 9500 North Shore Drive three nautical mile (4.8 km) southeast of the central business district of the city of Hillsboro, in Highland County, Ohio, United States.

Although many U.S. airports use the same three-letter location identifier for the FAA and IATA, this airport is assigned HOC by the FAA but has no designation from the IATA (which assigned HOC to
Komako Airport in Komako, Papua New Guinea).

Gallery

Facilities and aircraft 
It has one asphalt paved runway: 05/23 is 3,520 by 75 feet (1,073 x 23 m).

For the 12-month period ending May 22, 2009, the airport had 13,870 aircraft operations, an average of about 267 per week: 97% general aviation, 2% military, and 1% air taxi. At that time there were 21 aircraft based at this airport: 90% single-engine, 5% multi-engine, and 5% helicopter.

References

External links 
 

Airports in Ohio
Buildings and structures in Highland County, Ohio
Transportation in Highland County, Ohio